New England is an American rock band, who were best known in the US for their first single, "Don't Ever Wanna Lose Ya", which received heavy radio exposure on Album-oriented rock (AOR) stations and reached #40 on the Billboard Hot 100 chart in 1979. The follow up "Hello, Hello, Hello" also received some airplay. New England described their sound as "power-melodic-orchestrated-song-oriented rock"

Career
John Fannon, Jimmy Waldo, Gary Shea and Hirsh Gardner formed the band in the Boston area. They were discovered by Kiss manager Bill Aucoin. Paul Stanley helped the band record and produce their self-titled debut album, along with producer Mike Stone, known for his work with Queen and Asia among many others. The group went on tour in support of Kiss, but New England slid between the cracks of other Aucoin projects. The group's success stalled when their record label Infinity Records failed and was absorbed by its parent company, MCA Records in 1980.

The group moved to Elektra Records for their second album, Explorer Suite. That album garnered little commercial notice. The title track was released as a single, with management at their label Elektra hoping for interest in an unconventional extended pop song, similar to what they had witnessed a few years earlier for their labelmates Queen with the song "Bohemian Rhapsody". However, the songs "Living In The Eighties" and "Conversation" received more airplay than did the intended single.

Todd Rundgren's production on the slightly harder-rocking third album, Walking Wild, did not improve sales.

After the release of the third album, John Fannon left the group.  The remaining three members then began working with Vinnie Vincent, changed the name of the band to Warrior, and recorded a series of demos in 1982.  The project dissolved when Vinnie Vincent subsequently joined Kiss later that year. Shortly thereafter, Gary Shea and Jimmy Waldo joined the band Alcatrazz.  These demo recordings were eventually released on CD in 2017.

After the break-up, all of the members remained in the music industry. In late 2002, New England reunited to record "More Than You'll Ever Know", a song from the Hirsh Gardner solo album entitled Wasteland For Broken Hearts. It marked the first time the group recorded together in 20 years. In recent years, the band has reunited for a few live shows in the Boston area. Shea and Waldo made guest appearances at various musical instrument conventions such as the NAMM (National Association of Music Merchants) show in places like Anaheim, California.

The US reissue label Renaissance Records released a CD version of the first album. GB Records released the other two albums on CD, plus a live album and an album of early recording studio/studio sound recordings and reproduction/recordings made before the debut album. In 2009, Wounded Bird Records reissued Explorer Suite and Walking Wild on CD.

In 2017, Hirsh Gardner founded the "Hirsh Gardner Project" and release their debut album titled My Brain Needs a Holiday. In the summer of 2020, The Hirsh Gardner Project broke up

Reunion
While occasionally doing single reunion shows for charity, in May 2014 John Fannon discussed New England having new studio work and a possible full tour for 2015 during his solo appearance on the Concert TV series, On Stage with Mantis. A new single was released by the band in April 2015 titled "I Know There's Something Here" along with the b-side being a re-record of "Conversation" a song taken from the band's second album Explorer Suite.

EuroHouse covers 
"Get it Up" hit No. 1 on Billboard's Spain charts in July, 1995 and remained a top 10 hit into October, thanks to a EuroHouse cover by the group Sensity World. Sensity World was based in Valencia, Spain, with vocalist Aina Martínez Tejedor and producer Víctor Javier Grafia Gavin.

The song was featured in over 70 different EuroHouse CDs, cassettes, and records (the "Ibiza Mix 95" compilation alone sold over 300,000 units in Spain during 1995, as documented by both Promusicae and Billboard magazine.) DJ Sammy remixed a "Maxi" for the German, Belgium, and Holland markets. "Get it Up" had over 8 million views on YouTube as of October, 2022. And Sensity World still was performing this song in concert to large audiences in 2020.

Other groups also made EuroHouse covers. For example, in 2021, Soraya (Arnelas) released an updated version of "Get it Up" featuring Julian Poker in Spain. In the 2010s, Lorena Gomez released several versions of the song, featuring Carlos Gallardo, in Italy, Germany, and Spain.

Discography

Singles

Covers - EuroHouse

Promotional releases
1979 Live Concert Series (6 cuts) 12"    Infinity L33-1023
1979 "Don't Ever Wanna Lose Ya" / same (3:28/5:22)  12" Infinity L33-1009
1979 "Don't Ever Wanna Lose Ya" / same  (3:28/5:22)  7"   Infinity INF-50,013
1979 "Don't Ever Wanna Lose Ya" / "Shoot"   (Picture Disc) issued with various b-side adverts 7"    Infinity
1979 "Hello Hello Hello" / same   (3:20/3:20)    7"    Infinity INF-50,021
1979 "Hello Hello Hello" (3:20/3:34) 12"    Infinity L33-1018
1980 "Explorer Suite" (4:25/6:44) 12"        Elektra AS-11473
1980 "Explorer Suite" (4:25/6:44)  7"         Elektra E-47075
1980 "Livin' In The Eighties" (3:24) mono/stereo Elektra E-47106
1980 "DDT" / same (3:01) mono/stereo Elektra E-47155
1980"*Don't Ever Let Me Go" / same (3:41) mono/stereo Elektra E-47205

Compilations
New England (Self Titled Limited Edition Vinyl) (2020)

EuroHouse releases (Sensity World)
1995 "Get It Up", 12" White Label, Essential Sound Music ESN.003, Spain
1995 "Get It Up", 12", Essential Sound Music ESN.003, Spain
1995 "Get It Up", CD Maxi, Chrysalis 12 2735 2, Spain
1995 "Get It Up", CD Single PromoCar, Essential Sound Music SN003 CD, Spain
1996 "Get It Up", CD Maxi, Max Music Records GmbH 0062 035 MAX, Germany
1995 "Get It Up (Dance Version)", Ibiza Mix 95, Max Music, Spain
1995 "Get It Up (Dance Version)", Power Rangers Mix, Blanco Y Negro, Spain
1995 "Get It Up (Dance Version)", Sonic Mix, Arcade, Spain
1995 "Get It Up (Dance Version)", Top 95 Volumen 2, Arcade, Spain
1995 "Get It Up", Bad Boys, Boy Records, Spain
1995 "Get It Up", Danger Mix, Danger Music, Spain
1995 "Get It Up", Danze Manía, Prodisc, Spain
1995 "Get It Up", Dream Team, Max Music, Spain
1995 "Get It Up", El Monje Pastillero, Choco Music, Spain
1995 "Get It Up", Gran Velvet - Megamix, Max Music NM0018CD, Spain
1995 "Get It Up", Max Mix, Max Music Records GmbH 006193-2 MAX, Germany
1995 "Get It Up", Only For DJ: Promo 2, Prodisc CD P-002, Spain
1995 "Get It Up", Pelotazo Mix 2, BMG Ariola S.A., Spain
1995 "Get It Up", Planeta Dance 95, Bit Music, Spain
1995 "Get It Up", Planeta Dance 95, Bit Music PCD-039, Spain
1995 "Get It Up", Rave Zone, Prodisc OCS 1445, Spain
1995 "Get It Up", Techno Valencia 5, Contraseña Records, Spain
1995 "Get It Up", The Radical Dance, Chrysalis 7243 8354212 3, Spain
1996 "Get It Up (Dance Version)", Lo Mas 96, Code Music, Spain
1996 "Get It Up (Radio Edit)", Max Mix 2, Max Music Records GmbH, Germany & Spain
1996 "Get It Up (Radio Edit)", Viva Autumn Dance '96, Euro Star ES 3812, Ukraine
1996 "Get It Up", Aerobic Body Work Out, Body Music BWO 889, Germany
1996 "Get It Up", Dance Explosion Volume 9, S.A.I.F.A.M. SM-122-2, Italy
1996 "Get It Up", Disco Prezioso 2+1, Not On Label none, Germany
1996 "Get It Up", Maxima Locura 2, Choco Music, Spain
1996 "Get It Up", New Hot Plate Megamix - D.J. Collection Vol. 5, Musart, Mexico
1997 "Get It Up (Rmx From Germany)", Traffic Dance, Prodisc, Spain
1997 "Get It Up", Made In Spain, Contraseña Records, Spain
1997 "Get It Up", Traffic Dance, Prodisc CDP0010, Spain
1998 "Get It Up (Remix)", Mega Fiesta, Arcade 3201652, Spain
1999 "Get It Up (Dance Version)", Area The Secret Vol. 01, Vale Music, Spain
1999 "Get It Up", De Todo Un Poco, Vale Music, Spain
1999 "Get It Up", La Ruta Del Bakalao, Vale Music, Spain
2001 "Get It Up (DJ Ruboy Remix)", Fiesta En Cabina Vol. 2, Vale Music, Spain
2002 "Get It Up", 90's History - Techno Session, Contraseña Records CON-222-CD, Spain
2002 "Get It Up", DJ's En Directo Vol. 3, Contraseña Records CON-217-CD, Spain
2002 "Get It Up", Flaix Fm History Vol. 1, Bit Music 34-280, Spain
2003 "Get It Up", DJ Matrix (9) - Spanish Classics Vol. 1 (CDr Unofficial), La Musica , none
2004 "Get It Up (Dance Version)", Ibiza Mix 2004 - 10 Aniversario, Blanco Y Negro MXCD 1484, Spain
2004 "Get It Up", 100% 90's Vol. 2 - Lo Mejor Del Remember, Blanco Y Negro MXCD 1527, Spain
2004 "Get It Up", Jose Coll* - Remember The Music, Contraseña Records CON-258-CD, Spain
2004 "Get It Up", Los 90, Bit Music 36-854, Spain
2004 "Get It Up", Radical Gold - Cantaditas de Colección Volumen. 2, Dreams Corporation DCCD020, Spain
2004 "Get It Up", Raúl Platero* + Jota Demasiado - MDT La Maquina Del Tiempo, Contraseña Records CON-274-CD, Spain
2004 "Get It Up", Ultra Ultimate Trance, Music Street MSCD-3117, Singapore
2005 "Get It Up", DJ Marta Vol.5, Disco Imperio Corporation DCCD048, Spain
2005 "Get It Up", La Mákina De Los 90, Bit Music 37-194, Spain
2005 "Get It Up", Remixed Glory, Bit Music 37006, Spain
2006 "Get It Up", Solo Clasicos Del Dance, Disco Imperio Corporation DCCD068, Spain
2007 "Get It Up (2006 Dance Rmx)", Put Your Hands Up! Mix, Vale Music Universal Music Group 602517264625, Spain
2007 "Get It Up", Dance Remember Deluxe, Divucsa 37755, Spain
2008 "Get it UP", Sonido De Valencia (1990-1999), Contraseña Records CON-415-CD, Spain
2009 "Get It Up", Jose Coll* - Remember The Music Vol.4, Contraseña Records CON-458-CD, Spain
2009 "Get It Up", Raul Platero - La Maquina Del Tiempo - MDT 10º Aniversario, Contraseña Records CON-435-CD, Spain
2010 "Get It Up", Raul Platero - La Maquina Del Tiempo History, Contraseña Records CON-466-CD, Spain
2010 "Get It Up", Raul Platero Vs Jose Coll* - Cara A Cara, Contraseña Records CON-484-CD, Spain
2011 "Get It Up", It's Your Time - Past, Present & Future, Blanco Y Negro MXCD 2243, Spain
2012 "Get It Up 2k13", El Demolako - Step Dance - Special Remember Remixes (Parte I), Demokan STD SPR2012, Spain
2012 "Get It Up", 20 Anys Flaix FM, Blanco Y Negro MXCD 2426, Spain
2013 "Get It Up", Blanco Y Negro 83:13 (30 Años De Música Dance), Blanco Y Negro , Spain
2013 "Get It Up", MDT - Sports Fitness Aerobic - El Mejor Remember Para Entrenar, Contraseña Records CON-526-CD, Spain
2014 "Get It Up", MDT - La Maquina Del Tiempo Radio Hits - Los Nº1 De La Emisora Del Remember, Contraseña Records CON-533-CD, Spain
2016 "Get It Up (Dance Version)", Robben Cepeda Presents Vocal Classics Volume 1, Fractfinder Records FFR001, Spain
2016 "Get It Up", MDT - La Maquina Del Tiempo - Lo + Remember - Los Mayores Exitos Dance 90 y 2000, Contraseña Records CON-544-CD, Spain
2017 "Get It Up (Dj Ruboy Remix)", Chasis History 2017, Chasis Global Company HISTORY2017, Spain
2019 "Get It Up", Chasis - 30 Aniversario - Welcome To The Jungle, Chasis Global Company 30ANICH2019, Spain

EuroHouse releases by other artists 
2010 "Get It Up", Carlos Gallardo Feat Lorena, Ahora 011, Blanco Y Negro – MXCD 2114 CDT, Spain
2011 "Get It Up", Carlos Gallardo Feat Lorena, Anual 2011 (El Album Dance Del Año), Blanco Y Negro – MXCD 2147 CDT, Spain
2012 "Get It Up", Lorena Gomez (Remix By Bryan Mastermix), ESR Eurosound Records – ESR-1201, West Germany
2016 "Get It Up", Carlos Gallardo Feat Lorena Gomez (Brayan Master Mix), ESR Eurosound Records – BMR- 1603, Italy
2021 "Get It Up", Soraya featuring Julian Poker, Gothek Productions, Spain

Personnel
John Fannon: guitar, vocals
Jimmy Waldo: keyboards, vocals
Hirsh Gardner: drums, vocals
Gary Shea: bass

References

External links
 New England official website
 John Fannon's website
 Hirsh Gardner's website
 Gary Shea's website

Rock music groups from Massachusetts
Musical groups from Boston